Venkataraman Gopalakrishnan (1933 – 29 April 1998), was an Indian stage and film actor who was active in Tamil cinema during the latter half of the 20th century. He was well known for playing negative and supporting roles, but was also a successful character actor. In a career spanning close to five decades, he acted in more than 400 movies in Tamil, Telugu and Hindi. With his eloquent and stylish English. The film industry admired his strong English.

Early life 
Gopalakrishnan was born in 1933, in Tiruchirappalli. At the age of 9, he started his career as child artiste. He joined in the St. Joseph's College, Tiruchirappalli, when finished his bachelor's degree and he shifted into Madras joined University of Madras in Chennai and finished his master's degree. He showed interest in stage plays and joined a drama troupe in Tamil theatre and began to perform stage plays.

Personal life 
Gopalakrishnan was married to Lalitha. They had two sons. He died on 29 April 1998.

Partial filmography

1940s

1950s

1960s

1970s

1980s

1990s

As dubbing artist

References

External links 
 

1933 births
1998 deaths
20th-century Indian male actors
Actors in Tamil theatre
Indian male film actors
Indian male stage actors
Male actors from Tiruchirappalli
St Joseph's College, Tiruchirappalli alumni
Tamil male actors
University of Madras alumni